Clay McShane (died October 29, 2017) was an American historian.

Career
Clay McShane studied at the City College of New York and graduated in 1968. He attended the Smithsonian Institute for post-graduate work in the history of technology, where he was also a member of the visiting faculty. He continued his graduate education at the University of Wisconsin, where he earned his MA in 1970 and his PhD in 1975. His master's thesis, Wisconsin, Technology and Reform: Street Railways and the Growth of Milwaukee, 1887-1900, was published as a book in 1975. In 1975 and 1976, he was Visiting Assistant Professor at Carnegie Mellon University. He began his long tenure at Northeastern University in 1976, where he taught history until his retirement in 2012.

Citations

1943 births
2017 deaths
City College of New York alumni
Smithsonian Institution people
University of Wisconsin alumni
American historians
Carnegie Mellon University faculty
Northeastern University faculty